School of Army Aviation may refer to:
School of Army Aviation (Germany)
School of Army Aviation (Turkey)